The University of Science and Technology Beijing (USTB), formerly known as Beijing Steel and Iron Institute before 1988, is a national key university in Haidian District, Beijing, China. USTB's metallurgy and materials science programmes are highly regarded in China. It is a Chinese state Double First Class University Plan university, identified by the Ministry of Education of China.

History
 
The university was founded in 1952 from the combination of five former colleges. It known then as the Beijing Industrial Institute of Steel and Iron(). It was renamed as Beijing Steel and Iron Institute in 1960. The University of Science and Technology Beijing name was not adopted until 1988.

In 1997, USTB was selected into the first tier of universities for China's 211 Project (involved with the development of 100 world class universities in the 21st century for China).

Education and research

USTB consists of 16 schools, provides 48 undergraduate programs, 121 master programs, 73 doctoral programs and 16 postdoctoral research fields. USTB attaches great importance to the establishment and development of its academic disciplines. As a result of many years of development, 12 national key disciplines such as Ferrous Metallurgy, Materials Science, Materials Processing Engineering, Mechanical Design and Theory and Mining Engineering etc. have long enjoyed established fame both at home and abroad, so are Management Science and Engineering, History of Science and Technology which have won a high reputation as well. Disciplines such as Control Theory and Control Engineering, Thermal Engineering, and Mechatronic Engineering are being developed on a solid basis. In addition, newly developed disciplines such as Computer Science, Information Technology, Environmental Engineering, and Civil Engineering are being proctored at the university.

In December 2014, the total enrollment of 27,371 full-time students includes 13,393 undergraduates, 9,344 master candidates, 2,912 doctoral candidates, 243 junior college students and 829 international students.

USTB prides itself a strong faculty known for their meticulous scholarship and academic excellence. Among its 3,385 faculty are 452 professors, 745 associate professors. Including 7 academicians of the Chinese Academy of Science and 3 academicians of the Chinese Academy of Engineering.

Scientific research in USTB focus on the solution of major scientific and technological problems in the modernization of metallurgical and materials production, as well as the development of new technology. Many breakthroughs have been achieved in the areas of technological research and major technical problems have been solved for metallurgical and materials industries. From 1978 to 2002, 776 research projects have been awarded prizes at state, provincial or ministerial level, 106 prizes were at the state level. USTB has been awarded 153 prizes of various kinds since 1998, including 13 National Invention Prize, National Prize for Natural Sciences and National Prize for Advancement in Science and Technology. Among the 84 patents granted, 3 have been transferred to the American Iron and Steel Association, five have been rewarded with profit of over ten million yuan. From 1991 to 1993, USTB ranked sixth, fourth and fifteenth respectively among universities nationwide for winning the National Prizes for Natural Sciences, for Advancement in Science and Technology and the National Invention Prize. Besides, USTB plays an important role in academic disciplines. In 2002, USTB ranked the sixteenth and twenty-third respectively among Chinese universities for the number of theses included in EI and SCI.

Schools and departments
The University has large departments in physics, chemistry, engineering, economics, and English. One of the largest departments is the Department of Materials Science and Engineering. The University has about 20,000 undergraduate students and about 2,000 PhD and graduate students. The Department of Materials Science and Engineering has about 500 students in the undergraduate program and about 200 students in various graduate and PhD programs. The department has about 60 professors of which many have built their scientific career in the United States, Germany, and the UK. Owing to its origin as a former iron and steel university the university has one of the strongest departments in the field of materials science with strong international visibility and reputation particularly in the field of physical metallurgy and metal physics of the microstructures of structural and functional materials.

Schools
School of Civil and Resources Engineering
School of Energy and Environment
School of Metallurgical and Ecological Engineering
School of Materials Science and Engineering
School of Mechanical Engineering
School of Automation and Electrical Engineering
School of Computer and Communication Engineering
Dongling School of Economics and Management
School of Humanities and Social Sciences
Duoism Institute
School of Mathematics and Physics
School of Chemical and Biological Engineering
School of Foreign Studies
School of Marxism
Tianjin School
Graduate School

Departments

Campus

USTB total area 557,858 m² is located in Haidian District, Beijing, facing Fourth Ring Road, where most key institutions of higher learning are gathered. The USTB Gymnasium for 2008 Summer Olympics is located on the east part of the campus. It is one of the four competition gymnasiums in Beijing's universities, which provided places for competition items like judo and taekwondo in the 29th Olympic Games, as well as competition items like wheelchair basketball and wheelchair rugby in the 13th Paralympic Games. The USTB provides its students with newly built dormitories, completed in 2005. After the Olympic Games, the main part of the gymnasium is provided as the place for indoor physical education, fitness training, athletic contests and artistic performances. The comprehensive gymnasium is provided as the place for swimming teaching and aquatic park.

International students
USTB is an institution involving the Chinese Government Scholarship Program and has been accepting the international students since 1954. More than two thousands of students from 74 countries and regions have been studying and doing research work in the university. In fall of 2003,there are 81 international students, including 34 undergraduates, 15 master candidates, 8 doctoral candidates and 24 non-degree students (21 of them are language students). The numbers of students are growing every year.

Notable alumni
Lu Zhengyao, billionaire businessman, chairman of Luckin Coffee
Luo Gan
Liu Qi
Xu Kuangdi
Huang Mengfu
Zhang Zilin
Ganggang Hu Guidice

References

External links
  
 School of Materials Science and Engineering's English web page
 Campus real three-dimensional map

 
Universities and colleges in Haidian District
Project 211
Plan 111
Educational institutions established in 1952
1952 establishments in China